Temnostoma barberi  (Curran, 1939), the Bare-bellied Falsehorn, is a fairly common species of syrphid fly observed in the eastern half of the United States and adjacent areas of Canada. Hoverflies can remain nearly motionless in flight. The adults are also known as flower flies for they are commonly found on flowers, from which they get both energy-giving nectar and protein-rich pollen. Temnostoma adults are strong wasp mimics. The larvae burrow in moist decayed wood.

Distribution
Canada, United States.

References

Eristalinae
Insects described in 1939
Diptera of North America
Taxa named by Charles Howard Curran